Hemwati Nandan Bahuguna Uttarakhand Medical Education University (HNBUMU), also known H.N.B. Uttarakhand Medical Education University, is a medical education state university located at Dehradun, Uttarakhand, India. It was established in 2014 by the Government of Uttarakhand through the Hemwati Nandan Bahuguna Medical Education University Act, 2014. It has jurisdiction on all medical, dental, nursing and para-medical college in the state of Uttarakhand.

Affiliated colleges
, affiliated colleges include four medical colleges, one dental college, 39 nursing colleges, 29 paramedical colleges and two "other courses" colleges. Notable colleges include:
 Government Doon Medical College, Dehradun
 Government Medical College, Haldwani

References

External links

Medical and health sciences universities in India
Medical colleges in Uttarakhand
Universities in Uttarakhand
Universities and colleges in Dehradun
Science and technology in Dehradun
Educational institutions established in 2014
2014 establishments in Uttarakhand